Adam Gregory (born December 28, 1987) is an American actor. He is known for playing Thomas Forrester on the CBS soap opera The Bold and the Beautiful and Brandon on Nickelodeon's Winx Club.

Life and career
Gregory was born in Cincinnati, Ohio, the youngest of three sons. He graduated from Oak Hills High School in 2006, and was enrolled at Northern Kentucky University but dropped out to pursue his acting career. He has been married since February 2010, and their first son was born on 8 February 2013. Then on June 16, 2016, the two welcomed their second son.

He appears as Ashley Tisdale's ex-boyfriend in her music video for "It's Alright, It's OK". Gregory played the role of Ty Collins in The CW's 90210, who takes interest in Shenae Grimes' character during the first season.

In August 2010, he was cast as the new Thomas Forrester on CBS' daytime soap opera The Bold and the Beautiful, taking over the role from Drew Tyler Bell.

In 2014, he played the lead in the film Saints and Soldiers: The Void.

In 2016, he played a reality television star accused of sexual assault on Law & Order: Special Victims Unit in the episode "Assaulting Reality".

Filmography

External links
 

1987 births
21st-century American male actors
Male actors from Cincinnati
American male film actors
American male television actors
American male soap opera actors
Living people
Male models from Ohio